The European Network Against Racism (ENAR) is an EU-wide network of anti-racist NGOs. ENAR aims to end structural racism and discrimination and advocates for equality and solidarity for all in Europe. It connects local and national anti-racist NGOs throughout Europe and acts as an interface between its member organisations, and the European institutions. It voices the concerns of ethnic and religious minorities in European and national policy debates.

ENAR is funded by the European Union, the Open Society Foundations, the Joseph Rowntree Charitable Trust and the Sigrid Rausing Trust.

History 
ENAR is an outcome of the 1997 European Year Against Racism. Between March and September 1998, more than 600 NGOs were involved in national and European round table consultations to discuss the viability of such a structure. The 1998 Constitutive Conference of the European Network Against Racism brought together more than 200 representatives of these organisations to draw up a common programme of action.

Vision and mission 
ENAR's vision aims at guaranteeing equality for all, and recognizes the benefits of a diverse and racism-free Europe for European society and economy.

Its mission is to end structural racism in the European Union and to build structures, institutions and attitudes based on race equality and equal distribution of power, privileges and rights.

Areas of Work 

The following are some of the fields in which ENAR works:

 Racist crime and speech
 Employment
 Security and policing
 Equality data collection
 Migration and integration
 Specific forms of racism, including Afrophobia, Antigypsyism, Islamophobia and Antisemitism

Along with Equinox, ENAR has been denouncing the whiteness of the European institutions and argued for a greater representation or racialised communities in the policy discussions at the EU level.

Controversy

Links with the Muslim Brotherhood 

ENAR has been linked to the Muslim Brotherhood by MEP Frederique Ries, a claim also extended to its member organization FEMYSO. Michaël Privot, ENAR's former director, publicly admitted he had joined and then left the Muslim Brotherhood.

Members 
ENAR members include a wide range of organisations, from grassroots to advocacy organisations, from information centres, to trade unions, to faith-based organisations.

Member countries 
NGOs in the following countries form the coalition:

References

External links 
 

Anti-racist organizations in Europe
International organisations based in Belgium
Opposition to Islamophobia